Polona Hercog and Jessica Moore were the defending champions but did not compete in the Juniors this year.

Noppawan Lertcheewakarn and Sally Peers defeated Kristina Mladenovic and Silvia Njirić in the final, 6–1, 6–1 to win the girls' doubles tennis title at the 2009 Wimbledon Championships.

Seeds

  Laura Robson /  Sloane Stephens (withdrew)
  Kristina Mladenovic /  Silvia Njirić (final)
  Tímea Babos /  Ajla Tomljanović (second round)
  Ulrikke Eikeri /  Zsófia Susányi (second round)
  Daria Gavrilova /  Ksenia Kirillova (semifinals)
  Magda Linette /  Heather Watson (second round)
  Richèl Hogenkamp /  Lesley Kerkhove (first round)
  Valeriya Solovyeva /  Maryna Zanevska (second round)

Laura Robson and Sloane Stephens withdrew due to a back injury for Robson.

Draw

Finals

Top half

Bottom half

References

External links

Girls' Doubles
Wimbledon Championship by year – Girls' doubles